Hopalong Cassidy is a fictional cowboy hero created in 1904 by author Clarence E. Mulford who has appeared in a variety of media.

Hopalong Cassidy may also refer to:

 Hopalong Cassidy, a 1910 novel by Clarence E. Mulford
 Hopalong Cassidy (film series), a 1935-1948 film series starring William Boyd as Hopalong Cassidy
 Hop-Along Cassidy, the first film in the series
 Hopalong Cassidy (radio program), a radio program that aired from 1948 to 1952 and starred Boyd as Cassidy
 Hopalong Cassidy (TV series), a TV series that aired from 1949 to 1952 and starred Boyd as Cassidy
 Hopalong Cassidy, a 1949–1955 comic strip drawn by Dan Spiegle

See also
 Hopalong Cassady or Howard Cassady (1934–2019), an American football player
 Hopalong Cassidy River Trail, a trail in Illinois
 Hopalong Casualty, a 1960 animated short film